Bystander may refer to:

In media
Bystander (novel), a 1930 novel by Maxim Gorki 
Bystander (magazine), was a British weekly tabloid magazine
Guilty Bystander, a 1950 independent film production
Innocent Bystanders (film), a 1972 film directed by Peter Collinson
Iowa Bystander, an Iowa newspaper targeted toward an African-American audience

In music
The Bystanders, a Welsh close harmony pop group, formed in 1962
Bystander (album), a 2011 six track extended play by Canadian alternative rock band Jets Overhead
Innocent Bystanders, were a Perth-based band formed in 1983

Other meanings 
Bystander effect, a social psychological phenomenon wherein individuals do not offer help in an emergency when other people are present
Bystander effect (radiobiology), the phenomenon in which unirradiated cells exhibit irradiated effects as a result of signals received from nearby irradiated cells
Bystander Nunatak, a geographical feature in Antarctica
Perpetrators, victims, and bystanders, a typology in genocide studies

See also 
Innocent bystander (disambiguation)
Rubbernecking
Witness